Aurach is a river in the Austrian state of Upper Austria.

After leaving the Aurach Valley the river flows further through the Alpine foothills via Aurachkirchen (district of Ohlsdorf) until Wankham (municipality Regau), where it converges with the river Ager.

References

External links

Rivers of Upper Austria
Rivers of Austria